Roger Sainsbury may refer to:

Roger Sainsbury (bishop) (born 1936), British retired Anglican bishop
Roger Sainsbury (engineer) (born 1940), civil engineer